Anthony Ahasuerus Hendrik Sweijs (18 July 1852 in Amsterdam – 30 September 1937 in Rotterdam) was a Dutch sport shooter who competed in the early 20th century in pistol shooting. He participated in Shooting at the 1900 Summer Olympics in Paris and won a bronze medal with the Dutch pistol team.

References

External links
 

1852 births
1937 deaths
Dutch male sport shooters
Olympic bronze medalists for the Netherlands
Olympic medalists in shooting
Olympic shooters of the Netherlands
Shooters at the 1900 Summer Olympics
Sportspeople from Amsterdam
Medalists at the 1900 Summer Olympics